Vera Mindy Chokalingam (born June 24, 1979), known professionally as Mindy Kaling, is an American television actress, comedian, screenwriter and producer. She first gained recognition starring as Kelly Kapoor in the NBC sitcom The Office (2005–2013), for which she also served as a writer, executive producer, and director. For her work on the series, she was nominated for a Primetime Emmy Award for Outstanding Writing in a Comedy Series.

Kaling gained wider attention for creating, producing and starring in the Fox comedy series The Mindy Project (2012–2017). She created the NBC sitcom Champions (2018), also appearing in five episodes, the Hulu miniseries Four Weddings and a Funeral (2019), the Netflix comedy-drama series Never Have I Ever (2020–present), the HBO Max comedy-drama series The Sex Lives of College Girls (2021–present), Snowball Fight (2022–2023), and the HBO Max animated series Velma (2023). In 2023 she received the Norman Lear Achievement in Television Award.

Her film career includes voiceover work in Despicable Me (2010), Wreck-It Ralph (2012), and Inside Out (2015). She had roles in comedy films, such as The 40-Year-Old Virgin (2005), No Strings Attached (2011), The Five-Year Engagement (2012), The Night Before (2015), A Wrinkle in Time and Ocean's 8 (both 2018), and Late Night (2019), the last of which she also wrote and produced. Her memoirs, Is Everyone Hanging Out Without Me? (And Other Concerns) (2011) and Why Not Me? (2015), reached The New York Times Best Seller list. She also received a Tony Award for Best Musical as a producer for the musical A Strange Loop.

Early life
Vera Mindy Chokalingam was born in Cambridge, Massachusetts, to father Avudaiappan Chokalingam, an architect, and mother Swati Chokalingam née Roy-Sircar, an obstetrician/gynecologist (OB/GYN). She has an elder brother, Vijay. Kaling's parents are from India and met while working at the same hospital in Nigeria. Her father, a Tamil raised in Chennai, was overseeing the building of a hospital wing. Her mother, a Bengali from Mumbai, was working as an OB/GYN. The family immigrated to the United States in 1979, the same year Kaling was born. Kaling's mother died of pancreatic cancer in 2012.

Kaling has said she has never been called Vera, her first name, but has been referred to as Mindy since her mother was pregnant with her while her parents were living in Bengal. They were already planning to move to the United States and wanted, Kaling said, a "cute American name" for their daughter, and liked the name Mindy from the TV show Mork & Mindy. The name Vera is, according to Kaling, the name of the "incarnation of a Hindu goddess." Kaling graduated from Buckingham Browne & Nichols, a private school in Cambridge, in 1997. The following year, she entered Dartmouth College, where she was a member of the improvisational comedy troupe The Dog Day Players and the a cappella group The Rockapellas, was the creator of the comic strip Badly Drawn Girl in The Dartmouth (the college's daily newspaper), and was a writer for the Dartmouth Jack-O-Lantern (the college's humor magazine).

Kaling graduated from Dartmouth College in 2001 with a bachelor's degree in playwriting. She was a classics major for much of college and studied Latin, a subject she had been learning since the seventh grade. Kaling lists the comedy series Dr. Katz, Saturday Night Live, Frasier and Cheers as early influences on her comedy.

Career

2002–2004: Career beginnings
While a 19-year-old sophomore at Dartmouth, Kaling was an intern on Late Night with Conan O'Brien. Kaling has said that she never saw a family like hers on TV, which gave her a dual perspective she uses in her writing.  She thinks the "everyone against me" mentality is what she learned as a child of immigrants. She named her Mindy Project character Mindy Lahiri after author Jhumpa Lahiri.

After college, Kaling moved to Brooklyn, New York. Kaling said one of her worst job experiences was as a production assistant for three months on the Crossing Over With John Edward psychic show. She described it as "depressing." During this same time, Kaling performed stand-up comedy.

Kaling devised her stage name after discovering while doing stand-up comedy that emcees would have trouble pronouncing her last name, Chokalingam, and sometimes made jokes about it. She toured solo as well as with Craig Robinson before he was on The Office.

In August 2002, Kaling portrayed Ben Affleck in an off-Broadway play called Matt & Ben, which she co-wrote with her best friend from college, Brenda Withers—who played Matt Damon. The play was named one of Time magazine's "Top Ten Theatrical Events of The Year" and was "a surprise hit" at the 2002 New York International Fringe Festival. Initially, Withers and Kaling had, "for their own entertainment, mockingly pretended to be the best friends Matt Damon and Ben Affleck; that pretending spawned Matt & Ben, the goofy play that reimagined how Damon and Affleck came to write the movie Good Will Hunting."

Kaling wrote a blog, Things I've Bought That I Love, which reemerged on her website on September 29, 2011. The blog was written under the name Mindy Ephron, "a name Kaling chose because she was amused by the idea of her 20-something Indian-American self as a long-lost Ephron sister."

2004–2011: Breakthrough and The Office
In 2004, when The Office producer Greg Daniels was working to adapt The Office from the BBC TV series of the same name, he hired Kaling as a writer-performer after reading a spec script she wrote. He said, "She's very original ... If anything feels phony or lazy or passé, she'll pounce on it." When Kaling joined The Office, she was 24 years old and was the only woman on a staff of eight. She took on the role of character Kelly Kapoor, debuting in the series' second episode, "Diversity Day". Kaling's TV appearances include a 2005 episode of Curb Your Enthusiasm, playing Richard Lewis's assistant. She is featured on the CD Comedy Death-Ray and guest-wrote parts of an episode of Saturday Night Live in April 2006. After her film debut in The 40-Year-Old Virgin with Steve Carell, Kaling appeared in the film Unaccompanied Minors as a waitress.

In an interview with The A.V. Club, she stated that Kelly is "an exaggerated version of what I think the upper-level writers believe my personality is." Kaling directed The Office webisode The 3rd Floor. She directed the Season 6 episode "Body Language," which marked her television directorial debut. In 2007, she had a small part in License to Wed alongside fellow Office actors John Krasinski, Angela Kinsey, and Brian Baumgartner. Kaling starred in the 2009 film Night at the Museum: Battle of the Smithsonian as a Smithsonian National Air and Space Museum tour guide.

Her contract was set to expire at the end of Season 7. On September 15, 2011, she signed a new contract to stay with the show for Season 8 and was promoted to full executive producer. Her Universal Television contract included a development deal for a new show (eventually titled The Mindy Project), in which she appeared as an actress and contributed as a writer. Kaling left The Office after the ninth-season episode "New Guys". However, she returned to guest-star in the final episode of the series. In 2011, Kaling published a memoir, Is Everyone Hanging Out Without Me? (And Other Concerns), which appeared on the New York Times best-seller list. Her second book, Why Not Me?, covers the events that have happened in her life since 2011, and was published on September 15, 2015. Why Not Me? launched at No. 1 on the New York Times best-seller list. She published a third memoir, Nothing Like I Imagined (Except For Sometimes), with Amazon Original Stories in 2020.

Kaling and her fellow writers and producers of The Office were nominated five consecutive times for the Primetime Emmy Award for Outstanding Comedy Series. In 2010, she received a nomination for Outstanding Writing in a Comedy Series with Daniels for the episode "Niagara."  However, in a 2019 interview with Elle Magazine, Kaling spoke about the sexism faced by the Television Academy, because Kaling had to go through great lengths to prove her contribution as a producer after being informed by the television academy she was going to be cut from the producer list, because there were too many producers. To receive her rightful producing credit when the Office was nominated for an Emmy for an Outstanding Comedy Series, she stated, "They made me, not any of the other producers, fill out a whole form and write an essay about all my contributions as a writer and a producer," Kaling told Elle of how her name ultimately got put on the Emmys list. "I had to get letters from all the other male, white producers saying that I had contributed, when my actual record stood for itself." The Emmys rebutted Kaling’s statement in an interview with Refinery 29, but Kaling clarified in a series of tweets of choosing to make that statement during the Elle interview, as necessary, because it was part of her story, of the sexism faced during her tenure at The Office, before Kaling’s star power grew, honoring the challenges faced as she reflected on her career success to Elle.

In 2011, she played the role of Shira, a doctor who is a roommate and colleague of the main character Emma (played by Natalie Portman) in No Strings Attached. Kaling also made an appearance as Vanetha in The Five-Year Engagement in 2012.

2012–present: Producing and film work

In 2012, Kaling pitched a single-camera comedy to Fox called The Mindy Project, which Kaling wrote, produced and starred in. Fox began airing the series in 2012. In 2013, Time magazine named her on their list of the 100 most influential people in the world. Kaling notes that she is sometimes described as a pioneer, as there are not yet very many Indian-American women on television. Fox canceled the series in May 2015 but it was later picked up by Hulu for a 26-episode fourth season and a 16-episode fifth season. In March 2017, Kaling announced that the show's sixth season, which would air starting September 2017, would be the last. The series concluded on November 14, 2017.

Kaling voiced Taffyta Muttonfudge in Disney's animated comedy film Wreck-It Ralph and Disgust in Pixar's 2015 film Inside Out. In 2017, NBC ordered Champions, where Kaling is a co-creator, writer, and producer. She had a recurring guest role on the show, which premiered March 8, 2018, on NBC. It was cancelled after one season.

In 2018, she played Mrs. Who in A Wrinkle in Time, the live-action Disney adaptation of the novel, and starred alongside Helena Bonham Carter, Sandra Bullock, Cate Blanchett, Anne Hathaway, Awkwafina and Rihanna in Ocean's 8, the all-female version of Ocean's Eleven. 

In 2020, Kaling created the Netflix series Never Have I Ever with Lang Fisher, a comedy partially based on Kaling's childhood story growing up in the Boston area. It premiered on Netflix on April 27, 2020, and is about an Indian American high school student, played by Maitreyi Ramakrishnan, dealing with the death of her father. The series received positive reviews. The series has been described as a watershed moment for South Asian representation in Hollywood and has been praised for breaking Asian stereotypes.

In February 2021, HBO Max announced they had ordered the adult-oriented Scooby-Doo spin-off series Velma, with Kaling executive producing as well as voicing the titular character. The series premiered on January 12, 2023, to mixed reviews from critics and overwhelmingly negative reactions from both general audiences and non-critics. Velma became one of the lowest-rated television shows on IMDb, receiving similar low scores from audiences on Rotten Tomatoes and Google.

In 2023, she was appointed as a board member along with historian June Li and Young Yang Chung for the Smithsonian’s National Museum of Asian Art.

Upcoming projects

Kaling is set to co-write the third installment in the Legally Blonde series with Dan Goor. The film is scheduled to be released in May 2023. She is also committed to re-team with Dan Goor to write and star alongside Priyanka Chopra in a comedy about an Indian-American wedding under Universal.

Personal life 

In December 2017, Kaling gave birth to a daughter. She gave birth to a son in September 2020. Kaling is not married, and neither of her children's fathers' identities have been publicly disclosed.

Kaling has a close friendship with B. J. Novak, whom she met through writing for The Office, with Novak calling Kaling "the most important person in my life" (on Fresh Air with Terry Gross). The two dated on and off while writing and acting on the show. Novak is the godfather of Kaling's two children.

In 2012, Kaling was included in the Time 100 list of influential people. In 2014, she was named one of Glamours Women of the Year.

On June 10, 2018, she received an honorary degree of Doctor of Humane Letters from Dartmouth College in Hanover, New Hampshire.

Kaling is a 1% owner of Welsh football team Swansea City that plays in the EFL Championship.

Filmography

Film

Television

Writing credits

Directing credits

Awards and nominations 
In 2013, Entertainment Weekly identified Kaling as one of the "50 Coolest and Most Creative Entertainers" in Hollywood. In the same year, Kaling was recognized by Time magazine as one of the 100 most influential people in the world.

Bibliography 
 Kaling, Mindy, and Brenda Withers. Matt & Ben: A New Play. Woodstock, NY: Overlook Press, 2004; 
 Kaling, Mindy. Unbelievable Holiday Tales: Scripting a Fantasy of a Family, The New York Times, December 18, 2009.
 Kaling, Mindy. Is Everyone Hanging Out Without Me? (And Other Concerns), New York: Crown Archetype, 2011; ; 
 Kaling, Mindy. Questions I Ask When I Want to Talk About Myself: 50 Topics to Share With Friends, Clarkson Potter, 2013; 
 Kaling, Mindy. Why Not Me?, New York : Crown Archetype, 2015; ; 
 Kaling, Mindy. Nothing Like I Imagined (Except for Sometimes), Amazon Original Stories, 2020

References

External links 
 

1979 births
Living people
21st-century American actresses
21st-century American comedians
21st-century American women writers
Actresses from Cambridge, Massachusetts
Actresses from Massachusetts
American actresses of Indian descent
American comedians of Indian descent
American comedy writers
American film actresses
American people of Bengali descent
American people of Indian Tamil descent
American stand-up comedians
American television actresses
American television directors
Television producers from Massachusetts
American television writers
American voice actresses
American women comedians
American women writers of Indian descent
Audiobook narrators
Buckingham Browne & Nichols School alumni
Comedians from Massachusetts
Dartmouth College alumni
The New Yorker people
People from Cambridge, Massachusetts
Screenwriters from Massachusetts
Showrunners
American women television directors
American women television producers
American women television writers
Writers Guild of America Award winners
21st-century American screenwriters
American Hindus
Tony Award winners